Une femme libre (a free woman) is a three-act Theatre play by French dramatist Armand Salacrou premiered on 4 Octobre 1934 at the Théâtre de l'Œuvre.

Théâtre Saint-Georges, 1949 
 Direction: Jacques Dumesnil
 Characters and comedians :
 Lucie Blondel : Sophie Desmarets
 Aunt Adrienne : Jeanne Lion
 Célestine : Germaine Engel
 Paul Miremont : Jacques Dumesnil 
 Jacques Miremont : Yves Robert 
 Cher Ami : Claude Nicot 
 Max : Jean-Claude Michel
 Un encaisseur du gaz : Pierre Regy 
 A young man : Robert Durran 

French plays
1934 plays